A sex bolt is a type of mating fastener (nut) that has a barrel-shaped flange and protruding boss that is internally threaded. The bolts sits within the components being fastened, the flange provides the bearing surface. The sex bolt and accompanying machine screw sit flush on either side of the surfaces being fastened.

It is normally chosen because of its low profile compared to other nuts. The sex bolt often has a built-in feature, such as a slot, to aid in tightening the fastener. Some sex bolts, more commonly known as "architectural bolts", have knurled barrels to allow one-sided assembly.

The sex bolt consists of a female (internally) threaded barrel (nut) and a male (externally) threaded screw. Both the barrel and screw have heads designed to clamp (bind) material between the head of the barrel and the head of the screw, or to bridge the gap between two parts.

Other names for sex bolts include binding barrels, Chicago screws, and connector bolts.

Applications vary widely from book binding to installing bathroom partitions. This group of fasteners are used to assemble fitness apparatus, solar panels, playground equipment, railing systems, furniture, athletic helmets, knives, store fixtures, signs, panic bars, and many other products.

Technical guide to mating fasteners:

 Barrel diameter mating fasteners often are going through pre-drilled holes. The barrel diameter should be slightly less than the installation hole.
 Barrel length the barrel length is measured from underneath the head to the end of the barrel. Normally the length of the barrel is shorter than the thickness of the material being clamped. Another common term is "grip length", which is the thickness of the material that a mating bolt can effectively fasten or clamp.
 Thread size length and thread class fit for both barrel and screw. The more thread depth, the more difficult these parts are to manufacture, and the more expensive.
 Head style the most common head style for a mating fastener is a "truss" head. Other head styles are button, flat, grommet, hex head, large truss, low profile, oval, rivet and T-head.
 Drive systems mating fasteners are available in a variety of drives such as slotted, socket, Phillips, combination Phillips/slotted, as well as tamper-resistant drives: one way, 6-lobe with pin and drilled spanner.
 Material and finish mating fasteners are available in aluminium, steel, brass, copper, stainless steel and plastic materials. Barrels and screws are available anodized, zinc-plated, brass-plated, chrome-plated, bronze-plated, nickel-plated and black-oxide finish.

References

Nuts (hardware)